Musafir is a 2004 Indian Hindi-language neo-noir action thriller film written, directed and produced by Sanjay Gupta starring Anil Kapoor, Aditya Pancholi, Sameera Reddy and Sanjay Dutt in the lead roles and introducing Koena Mitra. The film was controversial because of some sensual scenes, including kissing, between Kapoor and Reddy. At the box office the film opened to almost near houseful collections of 80%–100% all over India but witnessed a steep fall by the end of its first week of release. It was the sixth highest grossing Hindi film of the year. The film is a remake of the 1997 Hollywood film U Turn.

Plot

Lucky (Anil Kapoor) is a small-time criminal, hoping to retire with his girlfriend Lara (Koena Mitra) after one last job. Unfortunately for him, things do not go as planned, and he becomes involved with a ruthless killer Billa (Sanjay Dutt). Lucky steals 2.5 million from Billa. But Lara steals it from him instead. He, then, learns that his friends have been murdered. Billa tracks Lucky down. But Lucky is able to strike a deal. He is to go to Goa and meet Jacko (Shakti Kapoor) and sell him a bag of unknown contents. He then meets Jacko and sets a rendezvous. On his return to his hotel, he comes across a Police inspector who seems to have become suspicious of Lucky.

At a small restaurant, he sees Sam (Sameera Reddy). He follows her and gets an opportunity to meet her when her car breaks down. He offers her a lift home. She introduces herself as Sam. When her husband, Lukka (Mahesh Manjrekar), shows up, they retrieve her car from the road, and go home. That night Lucky arrives in a disco to meet Jacko again. Here he again comes across Sam. After getting the money, Lucky prepares to leave the next morning. Sam arrives at Lucky's hotel to meet him. But their meeting is cut short when Lucky notices the same inspector. He tells Sam to hide and hides the bag of money in the vehicle of an unsuspecting motorist. By the time the Inspector leaves, the vehicle with the money is gone. Meanwhile, Billa tracks down Lara, gets the money back and kills her.

While Billa hides the fact that he has his money back, Lucky hides that he has lost the money. He again comes across Lukka. It turns out that he wants Lucky to kill Sam, and in return, Lucky would get 2.5 million. Sam meets Lucky and sets up a deal that if Lucky would kill Lukka, she would pay him 2.5 million. Both of them want the work done that night. That night Lukka tries to sexually assault Sam after she refuses to remove her blouse when he asks her to. Sam accidentally shoots Lukka dead. Lucky, however, gets the money, and both try to flee Goa. But the inspector is following them. Sam identifies the inspector as Lukka's brother Tiger (Aditya Pancholi) and the 2.5 million actually belong to Tiger. Lucky somehow shakes Tiger off his pursuit, and hides the money. The next morning she is nowhere to be found. Lucky desperately searches for her, and when he finally finds her, he realises that he has fallen in love with her. Suddenly they are attacked by Inspector Tiger with his police force.

Lucky is running out of ammunition when Billa arrives and shoots down all the police officers. Tiger, however, manages to escape by making Sam his hostage. At gunpoint, Lucky agrees to take Billa to the place where the money is hidden. When they reach the platform, Lucky finds that Tiger has discovered the money. Tiger and Lucky start fighting, but Billa intervenes and strikes a final deal. Both Lucky and Tiger have to walk on two parallel railway tracks blindfolded as a train comes towards them. If Lucky survives, then he will get the girl, while Billa will take the money, but if Tiger is saved, he gets the money, and Billa will take the girl.

The train, however changes tracks at the last moment and heads towards Lucky. Sam screams in horror and pleads with Billa to let her go. From Sam's scream, Tiger realises that Lucky is doomed. He takes off his blindfold and waves a farewell at Lucky. But Billa notices Tiger wearing a bracelet belonging to a deceased member of his gang and deduces Tiger must have been involved with their death. He promptly shoots Tiger dead. He then allows Sam to run to Lucky and try to save him. She pulls him off the tracks before the train could reach him. Billa smiles and rides away on his bike. After going a short distance, he stops and drops the bag to the ground in a brief act of generosity and then leaves.

Trivia

The TV presenter Konnie Huq appears as an extra in the club scene of the film.

Cast
 Anil Kapoor as Lucky 
 Sameera Reddy as Sam
 Sanjay Dutt as Billa
 Aditya Pancholi as Inspector Tiger
 Mahesh Manjrekar as Lukka
 Shakti Kapoor as Whacko Jacko
 Koena Mitra as Lara
 Aksha Pardasany as Young Sam
 Manoj Pahwa as Manu
 Ashwini Kalsekar as Angela
 Pankaj Taira

Critical reception

Musafir received mixed-to-positive reviews from critics. Taran Adarsh of Bollywood Hungama rated the film 4/5, stating that it is "embellished with some great performances, but the film clearly belongs to Anil Kapoor" and that the film "has style and substance." Planet Bollywood rated the film 8/10, stating that "Sanjay Gupta excels in developing his characters and letting them getting into the actual role, without restrictions." Review aggregator website Rotten Tomatoes gave the film a 58% rating.

Soundtrack 

The music of the film was composed by Vishal–Shekhar. Anand Raj Anand composed one track, "Ishq Kabhi Kario Na". Four tracks in the album are remixes of the original ones from Kaante. Dev Kohli, Kumaar, Vishal Dadlani and Milap Zaveri provided the lyrics. The music was applauded by critics and the audience for being experimental and different. The compositions of Vishal–Shekhar heavily used techno, and trance beats, and the album itself was divided into two CDs—"Club" and "Longue". Songs like "Ishq Kabhi Kario Na", "Saaki", and "Door Se Paas" were highly popular among the youth. Vishal–Shekhar made Kumar Sanu sing a techno song, "Phir Na Kehna", a very rare Western-style song for Kumar Sanu. According to the Indian trade website Box Office India, with around 18,00,000 units sold, this film's soundtrack album was the year's seventh highest-selling. The song "Saki" was recreated for film Batla House. Songs Rabba was recreated in Daaka and “Door Se Paas” will be recreated in the movie Satyameva Jayate 2.

*Originally featured in Kaante.

References

External links 
 

2004 films
2000s Hindi-language films
2000s crime action films
2004 action thriller films
2004 crime thriller films
Indian action thriller films
Indian crime thriller films
Indian crime action films
Films scored by Anand Raj Anand
Films scored by Vishal–Shekhar
Indian remakes of American films
Films directed by Sanjay Gupta